Bebaru virus is an RNA virus in the genus Alphavirus.

References

External links 
Wikispecies 
https://wwwn.cdc.gov/arbocat/VirusDetails.aspx?ID=56&SID=9
https://www.atcc.org/products/all/VR-1240AF.aspx
https://www.genome.jp/virushostdb/59305

Alphaviruses
RNA viruses